Ivan Hladush (Ivan Dmitrievich Gladush; 24 July 1929 – 6 December 2018) was a Ukrainian militsiya general.

Early life and education
Hladush was born on 24 July 1929 in village of Mishuryn Rih, Verkhnodniprovsk Raion, Dnipropetrovsk Okruha (today in Dnipropetrovsk Oblast). In 1951 he graduated the Dnipropetrovsk Autotransportation Technicum.

Career
Hladush started out in 1951 as an inspector at the State Auto Inspection (GAI). In 1957 Hladush graduated the All-Union Extramural Engineering Institute in Moscow. In 1963 he was in charge of GAI at the Directorate of General Order Security in Dnipropetrovsk Oblast. In 1968-1974 Hladush headed the Directorate of General Order Security in Dnipropetrovsk Oblast. During that period he graduated the Kyiv College of Ministry of Interior Affairs of USSR (today National Academy of Interior Affairs of Ukraine) in 1970 and in 1973 he received a rank of major general of Militsiya.

In 1974-1977 Hladush was a chief of Directorate of Interior Affairs in Donetsk Oblast. In 1982-1990 he was a minister of Internal Affairs of UkrSSR. In January 1991 Hladush retired as a Colonel General of Militsiya. In 2010 he was awarded a rank of General of Internal Service by the President of Ukraine Viktor Yanukovych.

In April 1988 Ivan Hladush as a minister of Interior headed a government commission in regards to recent findings in woodlands around Darnytsia. The commission came up with its report announcing that in Bykivnia were killed Soviet people by Nazi-Fascist invaders. It was partially true as there was Darnytsia concentration camp in close vicinity. Later another commission confirmed that Bykivnia was hiding much more.

Family
 Viktor Hladush, People's Deputy of Ukraine, Ambassador of Ukraine to Baltics states

Awards
 Fort-12 as "Firearm of Honour" (1997)
 Order of Merit (3rd degree, 1999)
 Order of Prince Yaroslav the Wise (5th degree, 2004)
 Order of Bohdan Khmelnytsky (3rd degree, 2008)
 Soviet awards orders of Red Banner, Red Banner of Labour, Badge of Honour

See also
 Bykivnia graves

References

External links
 Ivan Hladush at Sword and Shield
 Ivan Gladush at Peoples.ru

1929 births
2018 deaths
People from Dnipropetrovsk Oblast
Central Committee of the Communist Party of Ukraine (Soviet Union) members
Generals of the Internal Service (Ukraine)
Tenth convocation members of the Verkhovna Rada of the Ukrainian Soviet Socialist Republic
Eleventh convocation members of the Verkhovna Rada of the Ukrainian Soviet Socialist Republic
Recipients of the Order of Bohdan Khmelnytsky, 3rd class
Recipients of the Order of Merit (Ukraine), 3rd class
Recipients of the Order of Prince Yaroslav the Wise, 5th class
Recipients of the Order of the Red Banner of Labour
Soviet colonel generals
Soviet interior ministers of Ukraine